Slovak may refer to:

 Something from, related to, or belonging to Slovakia (Slovenská republika)
 Slovaks, a Western Slavic ethnic group
 Slovak language, an Indo-European language that belongs to the West Slavic languages 
 Slovak, Arkansas, United States

See also
 Slovák, a surname
 Slovák, the official newspaper of the Slovak People's Party
 

Language and nationality disambiguation pages